Hakan Çinemre (born 14 February 1994), is a Turkish professional football player who plays as a centre back for Denizlispor.

Professional career
A youth academy product of Fenerbahçe, Hakan mostly played on loan with various second division Turkish teams. He made his professional debut on loan for Gaziantepspor in a 1-0 Süper Lig loss to Akhisar Belediyespor on 14 February 2016. Hakan transferred to Göztepe on 25 July 2017.

References

External links
 
 
 

Living people
1994 births
People from Gölcük
Turkish footballers
Turkey youth international footballers
Fenerbahçe S.K. footballers
Bucaspor footballers
Adana Demirspor footballers
Gaziantepspor footballers
Eskişehirspor footballers
Göztepe S.K. footballers
Adanaspor footballers
Denizlispor footballers
Süper Lig players
TFF First League players
Association football defenders